Marcaim or Madkai is a census town in Ponda taluka, North Goa district in the state of Goa, India.  A number of its residents have the last name, Kamat, and belong to the Goud Saraswat Brahmin community.

It is famous for is Navdurga temple, where the idol of the goddess has a tilted head, which holds an annual festival called a "Zatra" around November (Actually the Kartik Shukla Paksha Asthami day every year).

The temple is also infamous for an ongoing legal suit filed in the Goa Bench of the Bombay High Court by the Mahajans (temple trustees) accusing members of Devi Navadurga Pratishtan (villagers) of taking articles from temple and shifting them from one place to another.

Government and politics
Marcaim is part of Marcaim (Goa Assembly constituency) and South Goa (Lok Sabha constituency).

References

Cities and towns in North Goa district
Villages in North Goa district